Tatsiana Fedarovich (sometimes listed as Tatyana Fyodorovich, born April 20, 1982) is a Belarusian sprint canoer who competed in the late 2000s. At the 2008 Summer Olympics in Beijing, she was eliminated in the heats of the K-1 500 m event.

References

Sports-Reference.com profile

1982 births
Belarusian female canoeists
Canoeists at the 2008 Summer Olympics
Living people
Olympic canoeists of Belarus
21st-century Belarusian women